Azazel is a Russian made for TV adaptation of Boris Akunin's introductory 'Erast Fandorin' novel The Winter Queen.

Plot summary
This historical detective story features a young police inspector, Erast Fandorin. Fandorin's adventures take place in the Russian Empire of the late 19th century, and he regularly finds himself at the center of key historical events, including development of Masonic and Revolutionary movements.

The hero is a young man, newly enlisted in the police force of the 1870s. This is a world with no forensic science, a rigid social structure and rigid proprieties, and police investigation techniques which respect the intuition of the intelligent amateur or newcomer. Fandorin is inexperienced, naive, downwardly mobile (the family fortune having evaporated), but cultured, intelligent, diligent, and desperately enthusiastic. He doesn't so much want to impress as want to succeed ... by a process of blind self-confidence and a youthful self-delusion that he is acting logically and scientifically. Fandorin is invited to investigate the suicide of a rich student. The young man has shot himself in public, but something seems strange about the suicide. Fandorin quickly exposes the murderous intrigue which has led to the death ... and opens up a can of worms which will have him crossing Europe in search of a mastermind ... or maybe even the godfathers behind a terrorist plot.

Cast
Ilya Noskov – Erast Petrovich Fandorin
Sergey Bezrukov – Ivan Franzevich Brilling
Marina Aleksandrova – Elizaveta von Evert-Kolokoltseva
Oleg Basilashvili – General Mizinov
Sergei Chonishvili – Ippolit Alexandrovich Zurov
Marina Neyolova – Lady Esther
Yuri Avsharov – Georg
Felix Antipov – Xavery Feofilaktovich Grushin
Larisa Borushko – Amalia Kazimirovna Bezhetskaya
Dmitry Burkhankin – Kokorin
Valentin Golubenko – Klaus
Yevgeni Grishkovetz – Achimas Velde

Remake

English-language version
Dutch film director Paul Verhoeven was set to film an English-language theatrical film remake of Azazel, titled "The Winter Queen", with Dan Stevens set to star as Fandorin and the leading female role to be played by Milla Jovovich. This movie was cancelled.

New Russian Version
In August 2022, Plus Studios has announces the completion of the filming of the new Azazel adaptation based on the bestseller by Boris Akunin. An aspiring detective lives in an alternative year of 2023, with modern technology and robotics helping him investigate. At the same time, Russia is still a monarchical system, since the only revolution that the country has experienced is technological. It was premiered on Kinopoisk HD streaming service on January 2023.

According to the sources, the official synopsis is that The October revolution did not take place, the Bolsheviks did not come to power, and Czar Nicholas III (played by Maksim Matveev) shares the government of the country with the progressive Prime Minister Dmitry Orlov (Evgeniy Stychkin). At this time, 20-year-old Erast Fandorin begins his career in the detective police department. Being engaged in not the most interesting work, he learns strange news: the owner of an oil pipeline company, a young millionaire, shoots himself in the temple in the center of Petrograd in front of dozens of people. Suicide falls on the camera recording of the police robot. Fandorin suspects that the case is more complicated than it seems, and takes on his first serious investigation.

The showrunner of the project is Alexandra Remizova (who worked on “Trigger”, “Patient Zero”), the director is Nurbek Egen (“Alibi”, “Sherlock in Russia”). The series also stars Mila Ershova, Alexander Semchev, Milena Radulovich (from "Balkan Frontier"), Artem Bystrov, Grigory Vernik. Erast Fandorin was played by Vladislav Tiron
.

References

External links

Trailer and Screenshots
Photo guide to Fandorin's places in St. Petersburg, then the capital of the Russian Empire

Films based on works by Boris Akunin
Channel One Russia original programming
Fictional portrayals of the Moscow City Police
2002 television films
2002 films
2000s Russian-language films
Russian crime films
Russian television films
2000s crime films
Russian crime television series
2002 Russian television series debuts
2002 Russian television series endings
2000s Russian television series
Russian television miniseries